Big Yellow Mountain is a mountain in the North Carolina High Country and wholly in the Pisgah National Forest. Its elevation reaches . The mountain generates feeder streams for the North Toe River.

Though named Big Yellow Mountain, it is actually  lower than nearby Little Yellow Mountain.

See also
List of mountains in North Carolina

References

Mountains of North Carolina
Mountains of Avery County, North Carolina